Robert Housmans (born 1974) is a Dutch politician and a member of the States-Provincial of Limburg for the Party for Freedom since 2015.

Housmans was a councilor and party leader on behalf of local parties in Sittard-Geleen, successively for Proud of the Netherlands, then for the localist Focus and Stadspartij. In March 2015, he was elected to the States-Provincial of Limburg for the Party for Freedom. Housmans is a deputy for the period 2019-2023 with security, care and the militia in his portfolio on the Provincial Council.

References

1974 births
Living people
Party for Freedom politicians
21st-century Dutch politicians
Members of the Provincial Council of Limburg